Pleasure is an American band from Portland, Oregon, United States. Blending soul, funk and jazz with a street edge, they became a cult group on the underground black music scene of the late 1970s. Their song "Glide", from the album Future Now, went to #55 on the Billboard Hot 100 and #10 on the Best Selling Soul Singles chart in 1979; it was their biggest hit. The band broke up in 1982.

A new version of the band re-formed in 2019 and released an album, Now Is the Time.

History
Pleasure was formed in Portland, Oregon in 1972 as a merger of two local bands: The Franchise which included drummer Bruce Carter (December 28, 1956 — August 12, 2006), bassist Nathaniel Phillips, and guitarist Marlon McClain, and The Soul Masters, which included keyboardist Donald Hepburn, keyboardist Michael Hepburn, saxophonist Dennis Springer, trombonist/guitarist Dan Brewster, vocalist Sherman Davis, and percussionist Bruce Smith. Other musicians have been part of the group along the way, including trumpet player Tony Collins and lead vocalist/guitarist Randy Hall.

In 1974, Grover Washington who was a big fan of the band directed them to seek out The Crusaders' Wayne Henderson. Impressed with what he heard, his enthusiasm led them to a deal with Fantasy Records. This was the beginning of a six-year relationship with the label and a four-year relationship with Wayne Henderson who through his own production company "At Home Productions", was the band's producer and mentor.

In 1979, the band released the album Future Now, which included the hit "Glide"; it went to #55 on the Billboard Hot 100 and #10 on the Billboard R&B chart.

Pleasure managed to fuse many styles of music including jazz, funk, soul, and rock along the way and achieved national recognition and excellent record sales, along with catching the ear of many hip hop artists who were inspired to sample much of Pleasure’s material.

This success was visibly evidenced with the now well-established African-American classic cult film, House Party featuring Kid and Play, and recently the comedy film Uncle Drew. Bruce Carter’s drum solo on "Bouncy Lady" along with songs "Let’s Dance" and "Joyous" were used in the Ultimate Breaks and Beats Series.

"Joyous" was also used on Janet Jackson's 1997 release, The Velvet Rope (“Free Xone”), and "Future Now" was used in Will Smith’s 2002 release, Born to Reign ("1000 Kisses"). "Celebrate The Good Things", "Thoughts Of Old Flames" and others are still being sampled and used today.

After their breakup in 1982 most members managed to stay active in the music scene one way or another through teaching, producing other acts, songwriting for Disney, and touring with artists such as Kenny G, Herb Alpert, The Crusaders, The Whispers, United We Funk All Stars, the Dazz Band and Cool’R.

Michael Hepburn (owner of the name and co-founder) is still performing, producing and is presently working as a Civil Deputy Prosecuting Attorney in the King County Office of the Prosecuting Attorney.

Pleasure now is composed of Michael Hepburn, Nathaniel Phillips, Douglas Lewis, Dennis Springer, Brian Foxworth, and Tiffany Wilson, and released an album on Pleasure Records in 2019 called Now Is The Time. They also released “One More Time” from the current album as the “A” side of a 45 rpm vinyl record by Neil Pounds under his UK label Six Nine Records Ltd. The “B” side of their 45 is “For Your Pleasure,” which is the introductory selection on the album.

Discography

Studio albums

Singles

References

External links
Pleasure Discography at Discogs.
Pleasure 1976 Biography at Concord Music.

American dance music groups
American disco groups
American soul musical groups
Fantasy Records artists
RCA Records artists
Musical groups from Portland, Oregon
1972 establishments in Oregon
1982 disestablishments in Oregon
Musical groups established in 1972
Musical groups disestablished in 1982